The ninth series of the Australian cooking game show MasterChef Australia premiered on 1 May 2017 on Network Ten. Judges Gary Mehigan, George Calombaris and Matt Preston from the previous series returned.

This series was won by Diana Chan in the grand finale against Ben Ungermann, on 24 July 2017.

Changes
This series introduced the "Power Pin" in the seventh week. The pin granted the wearer an extra 15 minutes of cooking time in any one challenge until the finals.

Contestants

Top 24
The Top 24 contestants were announced on 1–3 May 2017. Chosen contestant Josh Clearihan was a previous auditionee from the eighth series who failed to reach the auditions when he was hospitalized with brain damage after a run-in with a car thief.  The series featured other previous auditionees: Pia Gava, Benita Orwell and Eloise Praino.

Future appearances
 Ben Ungermann was a guest judge of MasterChef Indonesia (season 5).
 Ben Ungermann and Sarah Tiong appeared on Series 12. Ben withdrew from the competition on May 18, 2020, finishing 16th and Sarah was eliminated on June 9, 2020, finishing 10th.

Guest Chefs

Elimination chart

Episodes and ratings
 Colour key:
  – Highest rating during the series
  – Lowest rating during the series

References 

MasterChef Australia
2017 Australian television seasons
Television shows filmed in Japan